The 2017 Intermediate League World Series took place from July 30–August 6 in Livermore, California, United States. Guayama, Puerto Rico defeated Freehold Township, New Jersey in the championship game.

Teams

Results

United States Bracket

International Bracket

Consolation Round

Elimination Round

References

Intermediate League World Series
Intermediate League World Series